The 2014–15 Northern Arizona Lumberjacks women's basketball team represented Northern Arizona University during the 2014–15 NCAA Division I women's basketball season. The Lumberjacks, led by third year head coach Sue Darling and played their home games at the Walkup Skydome and seven games at the Rolle Activity Center. They were members of the Big Sky Conference. They finished the season 13–17, 9–9 in Big Sky play to finish in a three-way tie for fifth place. They lost in the quarterfinals of the Big Sky women's tournament to Eastern Washington.

Roster

Schedule

|-
!colspan=9 style="background:#003466; color:#FFCC00;"| Exhibition

|-
!colspan=9 style="background:#003466; color:#FFCC00;"| Regular Season

|-
!colspan=9 style="background:#003466; color:#FFCC00;"| Big Sky Women's Tournament

See also
2014–15 Northern Arizona Lumberjacks men's basketball team

References

Northern Arizona Lumberjacks women's basketball seasons
Northern Arizona